Brief psychotherapy (also brief therapy, planned short-term therapy)  is an umbrella term for a variety of approaches to short-term, solution-oriented psychotherapy.

Overview
Brief therapy differs from other schools of therapy in that it emphasizes (1) a focus on a specific problem and (2) direct intervention. In brief therapy, the therapist takes responsibility for working more pro-actively with the client in order to treat clinical and subjective conditions faster. It also emphasizes precise observation, utilization of natural resources, and a temporary suspension of disbelief to consider new perspectives and multiple viewpoints.

Rather than the formal analysis of historical causes of distress, the primary approach of brief therapy is to help the client to view the present from a wider context and to utilize more functional understandings (not necessarily at a conscious level). By becoming aware of these new understandings, successful clients will de facto undergo spontaneous and generative change.

Brief therapy is often highly strategic, exploratory, and solution-based rather than problem-oriented. It is less concerned with how a problem arose than with the current factors sustaining it and preventing change. Brief therapists do not adhere to one "correct" approach, but rather accept that there being many paths, any of them may or may not, in combination, turn out to be ultimately beneficial.

Founding proponents
Milton Erickson was a practitioner of brief therapy, using clinical hypnosis as his primary tool. To a great extent, he developed this himself. His approach was popularized by Jay Haley, in the book Uncommon therapy: The psychiatric techniques of Milton Erickson M.D.

Richard Bandler, the co-founder of neuro-linguistic programming, is another firm proponent of brief therapy. After many years of studying Erickson's therapeutic work, he wrote:

Notable therapists
 Nicholas Cummings (brief therapy, focused therapy)
 Milton H. Erickson (hypnotherapy, strategic therapy, brief therapy)
 Giorgio Nardone (brief therapy, strategic therapy)
 Steve de Shazer (solution focused brief therapy)
 Paul Watzlawick (Brief therapy, systems theory)

See also
 List of counseling topics
 Mental Research Institute one of the founding clinics of brief therapy and home of a number of the notable therapists mentioned above
 Solution focused brief therapy

References

External links
 

Neuro-linguistic programming concepts and methods
Cognitive behavioral therapy
Counseling